Conus santanaensis is a species of sea snail, a marine gastropod mollusc in the family Conidae, the cone snails, cone shells or cones.

These snails are predatory and venomous. They are capable of "stinging" humans.

Description
The size of the shell attains 17 mm.

Distribution
This marine species occurs in the Atlantic Ocean off Maio Island, Cape Verde.

References

 C. M. Afonso & M. J. Tenorio, Recent findings from the Islands of Maio and Boa Vista in the Cape Verde Archipelago: Description of three new Africonus species (Gastropoda: Conidae); Xenophora Taxonomy N° 3 - Supplément au Xenophora n° 146 - April 2014
 Puillandre N., Duda T.F., Meyer C., Olivera B.M. & Bouchet P. (2015). One, four or 100 genera? A new classification of the cone snails. Journal of Molluscan Studies. 81: 1-23

santanaensis
Gastropods described in 2014
Gastropods of Cape Verde
Fauna of Maio, Cape Verde